Elaine of Astolat, also known as Elayne of Ascolat and other variants of the name, is a figure in Arthurian legend. She is a lady from the castle of Astolat who dies of her unrequited love for Sir Lancelot. Well-known versions of her story appear in Sir Thomas Malory's 1485 book Le Morte d'Arthur, Alfred, Lord Tennyson's mid-19th-century Idylls of the King, and Tennyson's poem "The Lady of Shalott". She should not be confused with Elaine of Corbenic, the mother of Galahad by Lancelot.

Legend

The possible original version of the story appeared in the early 13th-century French prose romance Mort Artu, in which the Lady of Escalot (Demoiselle d'Escalot) dies of unrequited love for Lancelot and drifts down a river to Camelot in a boat. In the 14th-century English poem Stanzaic Morte Arthur, she is known as the Maid of Ascolot. Thomas Malory's 15th-century compilation of Arthurian tales, Le Morte d'Arthur, include the story.

Another version is told in the 13th-century Italian short story La Damigella di Scalot (No. LXXXII in the collection Il Novellino: Le ciento novelle antike). Two of Tennyson's famous and influential poems, both titled "The Lady of Shalott" (1832 and 1842), were later inspired by the Italian variant.

Le Morte d'Arthur
In Malory's telling, Elaine's episode begins when her father Bernard, the lord of Astolat (William Caxton's misread of Malory's original Ascolat), organises a tournament attended by King Arthur and his knights. Sir Lancelot was not originally planning to attend, he is persuaded otherwise and visits Bernard and his two sons before the tournament. While Lancelot is in her family's household, Elaine becomes enamoured of him and begs him to wear her token at the coming tournament. Explaining that Queen Guinevere would be at the tournament, he consents to wear the token but says that he will have to fight in disguise so as not to be recognized. He asks Bernard if he can leave his recognizable shield with him and borrow another. Bernard agrees and lends him the plain-white shield of Sir Torre, Elaine's brother.

Lancelot goes on to win the jousting tournament, still in disguise, fighting against King Arthur's party and beating forty of them in the tournament. He does, however, receive an injury to his side from Sir Bors' lance, and is carried off the field by Elaine's other brother, Sir Lavaine, to the hermit Sir Baudwin's cave (Baudwin being a former knight of the Round Table himself). Elaine then urges her father to let her bring the wounded Lancelot to her chambers, where she nurses him. When Lancelot is well, he makes ready to leave, and offers to pay Elaine for her services; insulted, Elaine brings him his shield, which she had been guarding, and a wary Lancelot leaves the castle, never to return but now aware of her feelings for him.

Ten days later, Elaine dies of heartbreak. In accordance with her instructions, her body is placed in a small boat, clutching a lily in one hand, and her final letter in the other. She then floats down the river to Camelot, where she is discovered by King Arthur's court, who call her 'a little lily maiden'. Lancelot is summoned and hears the contents of the letter, which explains what happened. Ashamed, he pays for her rich burial.

Modern culture

Paintings

Elaine has captured the minds of many painters, becoming one of the most recognizable tertiary characters from the Arthurian legends. Those who have depicted her story in their art include Dante Gabriel Rossetti, Emilie Autumn, Edward Reginald Frampton, Eleanor Fortescue-Brickdale, Elizabeth Siddal, Howard Pyle, John Atkinson Grimshaw, John William Waterhouse (The Lady of Shalott, The Lady of Shalott Looking at Lancelot, I Am Half-Sick of Shadows, Said the Lady of Shalott), Louis Rhead, Robert Gibb, Sidney Paget, Walter Crane, William Holman Hunt, Sophie Gengembre Anderson and William Maw Egley, among others.

Literary adaptations

 Adams, Oscar Fay, "The Water Carriers" (1886)
 Akhurst, W. M., Arthur the King
 Baring, Maurice, "The Camelot Jousts" (1910)
 Cabot, Meg, Avalon High (a modern adaptation) (2005)
 Fowler Wright, S., "The Ballad of Elaine"
 Hamley, Edward Bruce, "Sir Tray: An Arthurian Idyl" (1873)
 Kay, Guy Gavriel's, The Fionavar Tapestry [through the character of the lios alfar ("light elf") Leyse]
 Kilmer, Aline Murray, "For All Ladies of Shalott" (1921)
 Landon, Letitia Elizabeth, "A Legend of Tintagel Castle" (1833)
 Lang, Andrew, The Lady of Shalott (1888)
 Meredith, Owen, "Elayne le Blanc" (1875)
 Millay, Edna St. Vincent, "Elaine" (1921)
 Nieman, Valerie, "Elaine the Fair Accuses Lancelot" (2007)
 Phelps, Elizabeth Stuart, "Elaine and Elaine" (1883), "The Lady of Shalott" (1871)
 Rhodes, William Henry, "Rosenthal's Elaine" (1876)
 Sandell, Lisa Ann, Song of the Sparrow (2007)
Sebastian, Laura,  Half Sick of Shadows (2021)
 Steynor, Morley, Lancelot and Elaine: A Play in Five Acts (1909)
 Stoddard, Elizzle, "Before the Mirror" (1895)
 Tennyson, Alfred, Lord, "The Lady of Shalott" (1833, 1842) and "Lancelot and Elaine" in the Idylls of the King (1859)
 White, T.H., The Once and Future King (1958)

See also
 Elaine (legend)

References

External links

 Elaine of Astolat/The Lady of Shalott at The Camelot Project

Arthurian characters
Female characters in literature